The men's singles table tennis event at the 2011 Summer Universiade took place from August 15 to August 20 at the Shenzhen Bay Sports Center Gym in Shenzhen, China. The preliminary round was staged in pools, and the top players from each pool were moved to the elimination rounds.

Medalists

Preliminary round

Group 1

Group 2

Group 3

Group 4

Group 5

Group 6

Group 7

Group 8

Group 9

Group 10

Group 11

Group 12

Group 13

Group 14

Group 15

Group 16

Group 17

Group 18

Group 19

Group 20

Group 21

Group 22

Group 23

Group 24

Group 25

Group 26

Group 27

Group 28

Group 29

Group 30

Group 31

Group 32

Group 33

Group 34

Group 35

Group 36

Group 37

Elimination Draw

Finals

Top half

Section 1

Section 2

Bottom half

Section 3

Section 4

References
Preliminary Round Draw
Elimination Main Draw

Table tennis at the 2011 Summer Universiade